Ten Dark Women (literally "ten black women") is a 1961 Japanese film directed by Kon Ichikawa.

Plot
A married television executive has many mistresses. Nine of the mistresses and his wife band together and plan to kill him. His wife tells him they are planning to kill him and they fake his death at a meeting of all ten women using a pistol loaded with blanks and a tomato.

The other women tell her that they were not really serious about killing him and run away. One of the women, Miwako, commits suicide, and her ghost comes back to view the proceedings. Then they find out that he is not really dead, and they decide to kill him again.

His wife divorces him and one of the other women takes him on.

Cast
 Eiji Funakoshi as Matsukichi
 Keiko Kishi
 Tamao Nakamura
 Fujiko Yamamoto
 Juzo Itami
 Hajime Hana
 Jun Hamamura

Staff

Reception
Donald Richie describes it as "an extraordinarily black comedy ... the hilarious hell of a man whose wife, mistresses and girlfriends conspire to murder him".

Cast

References

External links

Japanese crime comedy-drama films
1961 films
Films with screenplays by Natto Wada
Films directed by Kon Ichikawa
1960s Japanese-language films
Films scored by Yasushi Akutagawa
1960s Japanese films